The Remenham Club is a private members club near the village of Remenham on the Berkshire bank of the River Thames near Henley-on-Thames, on the reach of the river that plays host to the annual Henley Royal Regatta.

It was formed in 1909 by members of six amateur rowing clubs (known as the "founding clubs") on the River Thames:

 Kingston Rowing Club
 London Rowing Club
 Molesey Boat Club
 Staines Boat Club
 Thames Rowing Club
 Twickenham Rowing Club

The seventh founding club, Vesta Rowing Club, was invited to join shortly after the second World War.

Although originally open to any past or present member of a rowing club affiliated to the Amateur Rowing Association, in 1947 membership was restricted to members of the founding clubs. Currently, those wishing to join must have raced competitively for a period of years with their founding club, won enough status points, and displayed sufficient proficiency in oarsmanship to qualify.

Remenham Club is a social club only as members are not allowed to race under the club's name.

Situated approximately halfway down the Henley Royal Regatta course, a marquee is conveniently placed on "the mound" during the regatta, which allows members to look down at the throngs squeezing past on the towpath and, due to the restricted number of guest tickets available, offers a good view of the racing throughout the whole five days without ever getting uncomfortably busy.

The club acts as the finish line for the Henley Women's Regatta.

See also
Rowing on the River Thames

External links
Remenham Club
The Rabbit's Guide to Henley Royal Regatta

1909 establishments in England
Henley-on-Thames
Sports clubs in Berkshire
Henley Royal Regatta
Rowing in Berkshire